The following is a timeline of the history of the city of Des Moines, Iowa, USA.

19th century
 1843 - Fort Des Moines U.S. Army post established.
 1846
 Fort Des Moines becomes seat of Polk County.
 Subscription schools open "in cabins along Raccoon Row."
 1848 - Woodland Cemetery established as Fort Des Moines Cemetery
 1849 - Iowa Star newspaper begins publication.
 1851
 Flood of 1851.
 September 22: Town incorporated.
 1853 - Benjamin Luce elected mayor.
 1854 - Western Stage Company begins operating.
 1855 - Brass Band formed.
 1856 - Iowa Weekly Citizen newspaper begins publication.
 1857
 Iowa state capital relocated to Des Moines from Iowa City.
 City chartered.
 1858 - Bridge built over Des Moines River at Court Avenue.
 1861 - Western Union Telegraph begins operating.
 1865 - Hook and Ladder fire company organized.
 1866
 August: Railroad begins operating.
 Des Moines Library Association organized.
 1867
 April: Flood.
 State Arsenal built.
 1870
 Polk County Woman's Suffrage Association organized.
 Capital City Nurseries in business.
 1872 - Caledonian Club organized.
 1874 - Younker Brothers Department Store in business.
 1875 - June: State Republican Convention held.
 1878 - Cottage Hospital opens.
 1881 - Drake University established.
 1883 - Foster Opera House built.
 1884 - Capital City commercial college founded.
 1885 - Des Moines Women's Club founded.
 1886 - Iowa State Capitol built.
 1888 - William Lytle Carpenter elected mayor.
 1889 - Des Moines Zoological Gardens opens.
 1890
 Highland Park College founded.
 Population: 50,093.
 1893 - Sisters of Mercy from Davenport, Iowa open first hospital in Des Moines.  Begin in temporary quarters at Hoyt Sherman Place.  First permanent hospital opened at 4th and Ascension Streets, north of downtown, in 1895
 1895
 Grand View College founded. 
 Young Women's Christian Association founded.
 1896 - Women's Press Club and Proteus Club founded.
 1898 - S.S. Still College of Osteopathy founded.
 1900 - Population: 62,139.

20th century
 1901 - Fort Des Moines re-established.
 1902 - Register and Leader newspaper in publication.
 1904 - George W. Mattern, Republican, was elected mayor of Des Moines (March 28) over W. L. Carpenter, Democrat
 1906 - Polk County Courthouse and The Lexington (apartment building) constructed.
 1907 - New city charter and plan adopted.
 1910
 Hotel Cargill in business.
 Population: 86,368.
 1914 - Billy Robinson flies from Des Moines to Kentland, Indiana.
 1915 - Riverview Park (amusement park) opens.
 1917 - Fort Des Moines Provisional Army Officer Training School active.
 1918 - 1918 influenza epidemic.
 1920 - Des Moines League of Women Voters founded.
 1923
 Ground-breaking for Salisbury House; property completed in 1928
 Hoyt Sherman Place Theatre built.
 1924 - Equitable Building constructed.
 1931 - Allen Hazen Water Tower built.
 1933 - Des Moines Airport built.
 1934 - September: Labor strike.
 1935 - Iowa Taxpayers Association headquartered in Des Moines.
 1955 - Veterans Memorial Auditorium opens.
 1958 - Sister city relationship established with Kofu, Japan.
 1959 - Merle Hay Mall in business.
 1965 - Iowa Genealogical Society founded.
 1966 - Blank Park Zoo opens.
 1972 - Gateway Dance Theatre founded.
 1973 - Financial Center built.
 1975 - Ruan Center built.
 1978 - Fire in Merle Hay Mall.
 1981 - Des Moines Marriott Hotel built.
 1983 - Des Moines Rowing Club organized.
 1985
 Sister city relationships established with Shijiazhuang, China and Saint-Étienne, France.
 Plaza Building constructed.
 1986 - HUB Tower built.
 1991 - 801 Grand built.
 1992
 Sister city relationship established with Stavropol, Russia.
 Sec Taylor Stadium (now known as Principal Park) opens
 1994 - Iowa Barnstormers begin play
 1997
 Preston Daniels becomes mayor.
 EMC Insurance Building constructed.
 Des Moines Dragons basketball team formed.
 City website online.
 2000 - Population: 197,800

21st century

 2004 - Frank Cownie (D) elected mayor.
 2005 - Wells Fargo Arena officially opens.
 2006 - Sister city relationship established with Province of Catanzaro, Italy.
 2010 - Population: 203,433.

See also
 List of Des Moines sports teams
 National Register of Historic Places listings in Polk County, Iowa
 History of Iowa
 List of Iowa railroads

References

Bibliography

Published in the 19th century
 
 
 
 
 
 

Published in the 20th century
  1903, 1917, 1920, 1921
  1908-
 
 
 
 
 
 . + Chronology
 
 
 
 

Published in the 21st century
 Friedericks, William B.  Covering Iowa: The History of the Des Moines Register and Tribune Company, 1849-1985 (Iowa State University Press, 2000), 318 pp.

External links

 
 Items related to Des Moines, various dates (via Digital Public Library of America).

Years in Iowa
Des Moines, Iowa
Des Moines
Des Moines
des moines